Retribution is a 2015 Spanish-French action thriller film directed by Dani de la Torre starring Luis Tosar, Javier Gutiérrez, Elvira Mínguez and Goya Toledo. It was screened in the Venice Days section of the 72nd Venice International Film Festival.

Plot
Carlos is a bank executive with two kids, Marcos and Sara, and a wife, Marta. His kids are getting ready to go to school and he is getting ready to drive them. They get in the car and Marcos brings a soccer ball with an autograph on it because he wants to prove to his friends that he really does have the autograph. After starting the car, Carlos receives an anonymous call in a phone that has been left inside and he is told a bomb has been placed under each of the car’s seats, set to explode if any of them leaves their seated position. The devices will be deactivated only once Carlos transfers a large sum of money into the caller's account.

He stops the car near the school to try to figure this out. Some kids from the school crowd around the car, wanting to see the ball with the autograph. Carlos can't let Marcos get out to show his classmates the ball, and his friends think he was lying. Carlos calls one of his coworkers and they say the mysterious man on the phone (who will be referred to as "the stranger") called them too. Carlos and his coworker meet up and discuss the situation, still in each of their cars, blocking traffic. While Carlos drives away, someone in his coworker’s car gets out and the car blows up. Carlos drives past the blown up car in horror, and the stranger orders Carlos to drive away quickly. Marcos is injured in the explosion and Carlos wants to drive him to the hospital, but the stranger won’t let him until he transfers the money.

Carlos calls Marta, tells her about the situation, and tells her to go to the bank to transfer the money in her accounts to the stranger’s account. Carlos sits in his car near the bank. Marta shows up to the bank with another person.

On the phone, Carlos is stopped by police and is isolated by a bomb squad. He is then told that he must release Marcos and Sarah, but still believes they are in danger. After negotiation with them, they find out there is only a bomb in the front two seats. Marcos still injured by the explosion in his leg is released, but Sara jumps in the front not wanting to abandon Carlos.

After some time, Sara and Carlos are visited by a past client, named Lucas but claims to be Carlos's brother Pablo. He tells them he was the one extorting the money over the phone from Carlos for having his wife commit suicide after being coaxed into making bad investments that ruined her economically.

Lucas leaves and begins telling him over the phone that a separate bomb he showed them before will go off if Carlos doesn't make an escape to a location where more money can be sent to his account in 5 minutes. Sara and Carlos hastily escape in spite of the behest of authorities until they reach a dock where Sara reluctantly accepts to leave for her safety.

Lucas returns to Carlos in the passenger seat and explains himself, Carlos then decides to drive the car into the water in order to escape the explosion. After driving into the water and swimming away, Carlos escapes and is resuscitated by paramedics and is later laid off from his bank job.

The final scene includes Carlos on the phone with the new employee in his previous managerial position telling him about a business opportunity, promptly hangs up the phone after the caller states how important family is to a business, hinting at the film's intended message.

Cast

Production 
The film was shot in 2014 in A Coruña.

Release 
Retribution made its world premiere on 2 September 2015, screened as the opening film of the Venice Festival's parallel section Giornate degli autori. The film was also presented on 22 September 2021 at the San Sebastián International Film Festival. Distributed by Warner Bros., the film was theatrically released in Spain on 25 September 2015.

Reception  
Reviewing the film from Venice, Guy Lodge of Variety considered that "pumped up but wholly derivative, Dani de la Torre's bomb-on-wheels thriller makes for an efficient Hollywood calling card".

David Rooney of The Hollywood Reporter, considering that the film was an odd choice for the "auteur-driven" Venice Days, concluded that it was "'Locke' meets 'Speed,' bypassing originality and plausibility".

Rubén Romero Santos of Cinemanía rated the film with 3½ out of 5 stars, deeming it to be a "qualitative leap" for Spanish thrillers, also considering that "few Spanish films can boast of having the same technical qualities". He however pointed out that the film falters because of its sound.

Awards and nominations

|-
| rowspan = "17" align = "center" | 2016 || 21st Forqué Awards || Best Actor || Luis Tosar ||  || 
|-
| rowspan=6 | 3rd Feroz Awards
| colspan=2 | Best Drama Film
|  || rowspan = "6" | 
|-
| Best Director
| Dani de la Torre
| 
|-
| Best Main Actor
| Luis Tosar
| 
|-
| Best Supporting Actor
| Javier Gutiérrez
| 
|-
| Best Supporting Actress
| Elvira Mínguez
| 
|-
| colspan=2 | Best Trailer
| 
|-
| rowspan=8 | 30th Goya Awards
| Best Original Screenplay
| Alberto Marini
|  || rowspan = "8" | 
|-
| Best Actor
| Luis Tosar
| 
|-
| Best Supporting Actress
| Elvira Mínguez
| 
|-
| Best New Director
| Dani de la Torre
| 
|-
| Best Editing
| Jorge Coira
| 
|-
| Best Production Supervision
| Carlos Pérez de Albéniz
| 
|-
| Best Sound
| David Machado, Jaime Fernández and Nacho Arenas
| 
|-
| Best Special Effects
| Isidro Jiménez and Pau Costa
| 
|-
| 25th Actors and Actresses Union Awards || Best Film Actor in a Minor Role || Fernando Cayo ||  || 
|-
| 3rd Platino Awards || colspan = "2" | Best Ibero-American Debut Film ||  || 
|}

Remake
German remake Don't. Get. Out! (2018), directed by Christian Alvart, was the first remake of the film.

In 2017 it was announced that Liam Neeson will star in a remake, in the lead role.

See also 
 List of Spanish films of 2015

References

External links
 
 Venice Days - Official Selection
 

2015 films
2015 action thriller films
Spanish action thriller films
Films set in Galicia (Spain)
2010s Spanish-language films
Vaca Films films
Atresmedia Cine films
Films shot in Galicia (Spain)
Films about automobiles
Films about mobile phones
2010s Spanish films